The 2003 South Australian Soccer Federation season was the 97th season of soccer in South Australia.

2003 SASF Premier League

The 2003 South Australian Premier League was the third last season of the SASF Premier League, the top level domestic association football competition in South Australia. It was contested by 12 teams in a single 22 round league format, each team playing all of their opponents twice.

Finals

2003 SASF State League

The 2003 South Australian State League was the third last season of the SASF State League, as the second highest domestic level association football competition in South Australia. It was contested by 12 teams in a single 22 round league format, each team playing all of their opponents twice.

Finals

See also
2003 SASF Premier League
2003 SASF State League
National Premier Leagues South Australia
Football Federation South Australia

References

2003 in Australian soccer
Football South Australia seasons